Moodadi  is a village in Koyilandy thaluk of Kozhikode district in the state of Kerala, India.

Railway Station
The nearest railway station is Vellarakkad on the Shoranur - Mangalore line. Villagers mainly use buses for public transport.

Demographics
 India census, Moodadi had a population of 29607 with 14248 males and 15359 females.

Schools
Around ten primary schools are there in Moodadi village, provides training in both Malayalam and English medium. Veemangalam UP School moodadi is popular for its Youth Green Community activities.

Transportation
Moodadi village connects to other parts of India through Koyilandy town.  The nearest airports are at Kannur and Kozhikode.  The nearest railway station is at Koyiandy.  The national highway no.66 passes through Koyilandy and the northern stretch connects to Mangalore, Goa and Mumbai.  The southern stretch connects to Cochin and Trivandrum.  The eastern National Highway No.54 going through Kuttiady connects to Mananthavady, Mysore and Bangalore.

See also
 Chengottukavu
 Naduvannur
 Arikkulam
 Thikkodi
 Chemancheri
 Kappad
 Atholi
 Ulliyeri
 Cheekilode
 Nochad
 Koyilandy
 Vellarakkad railway station

References

Koyilandy area